La Vilella Baixa is a village in the province of Tarragona and autonomous community of Catalonia, Spain.

References

External links
 A day trip to New York of the Priorat – La Vilella Baixa, Catalonia, Spain (in English)
 Government data pages 

Municipalities in Priorat